The NASA RealWorld-InWorld Engineering Design Challenge is an activity that encourages students in grades 7–12 to explore and build skills for careers in science, technology, engineering, and math (STEM fields) through two phases of project-based learning and team competition. The RealWorld-InWorld experience provides teams of students working initially with teachers/coaches the opportunities to solve NASA-inspired engineering problems and build solutions with university students and engineering mentors in a virtual reality setting. Teams consider real-world questions related to both the James Webb Space Telescope and the dextrous humanoid robot known as Robonaut 2, and then work to develop logistical solutions to the actual problems that researchers and scientists are solving today. RealWorld-InWorld is a joint education initiative of the National Aeronautics and Space Administration (NASA), the National Institute of Aerospace (NIA), USA TODAY Education

The RealWorld-InWorld NASA Engineering Design Challenge builds on the SIGHT/INSIGHT design challenge developed by USA TODAY Education and NASA and the Virtual Exploration Sustainability Challenge (VESC) developed by NIA and NASA. Both education initiatives were based upon NASA themes and content for students in grades 7-12.

Problem solving
Students will attempt to answer one of two questions regarding either the James Webb Space Telescope or Robonaut 2.
Robonaut 2 has a pair of "arms", but what it needs is a way to attach itself to the outer walls of the International Space Station while in open space. With its "legs" in development; students are to design a "zero-G-foot" for Robonaut 2 that will provide stability and support during space walks.
The James Webb Space Telescope is a large infrared space telescope designed to replace the Hubble Space Telescope. Design a large shield that can keep JWST cold while also allowing it to detect infrared light from faint sources such as distant galaxies and extrasolar planets.

Robonaut 2

History and application
Robonaut 2 is a highly dexterous anthropomorphic humanoid robot built and designed at NASA Johnson Space Center. Robonaut 2 is employed in situations where risk factors are too high and thus endanger human life. The development of Robonaut 2, and future prospects of other dexterous humanoid robots, are meant to enhance human capabilities for exploration and construction in space; by allowing the utilization of robots with greater mobility than suited astronauts to complete complicated missions or venture into environments not safe for humans. Robonaut 2 has the distinction of being the first of its kind (there are four similar robots) to not only go into space, but also perform tasks aboard the International Space Station (ISS). Robonaut 2, commonly referred to as R2, is the first U.S. robot to board ISS. The value of being a "dexterous humanoid" robot as opposed to any other design, is that R2 can use the same tools used by humans and work beside them in the same spaces. For the development of R2, NASA is partnering with General Motors (GM) and Oceaneering Space Systems (OSS). These partnerships will aid in the acceleration of R2 as a new technology, with the goal of helping the robot match and eventually exceed human dexterity before being employed in both the aerospace and automotive industry.

R2 improves on its predecessor, R1, in a number of ways.  R2 moves four times faster than R1, is more compact, and has a higher level of dexterity and a deeper and wider range of sensing capabilities.  R2 incorporates many advanced technologies including optimized overlapping dual arm dexterous workspace, series elastic joint technology, extended finger and thumb travel, miniaturized 6-axis load cells, redundant force sensing, ultra-high speed joint controllers, extreme neck travel, and high resolution camera and IR systems.

The James Webb Space Telescope (JWST)

History and application
The James Webb Space Telescope is the next generation in deep space imaging systems. The James Webb Space Telescope seeks to provide a better understanding of the origins of the earth and life in the universe. This telescope is significant to future scientific breakthroughs and through the RealWorld-InWorld Engineering Design Challenge students use the engineering design process to solve problems related to the James Webb Space Telescope.

James Webb
The James Webb Space Telescope, also known as JWST, was named after former NASA Administrator James Webb. Webb ran the space agency from February 1961 until October 1968. He is considered to have made great contributions to space science which led to the JWST, the next-generation space telescope, which bears his name. Webb is most commonly linked to the Apollo Space Program. It is surprising, considering his vast accomplishments, that Webb was somewhat reluctant to accept the position as NASA administrator. He was not an engineer or scientist, but had held other notable positions in government and aerospace industry. President Kennedy believed Webb to be the best man for the position and convinced him that the position of NASA Administrator was a largely policy oriented position.

Although President Kennedy had committed to landing a man on the Moon before the end of the century, Webb believed the challenge to be important in many sectors, such as education and industry, rather than strictly political. Webb is credited with the great scientific productivity of the space agency during the 1960s. Many programs allowed Americans to discover new information about outer space with probes sent to Mars and Venus, while others prepared Americans to make the first steps on the Moon, with robotic exploration of the surface. By the time Webb retired in 1968, shortly before the Moon landing in 1969, the agency had launched over 75 missions.

Webb enhanced the role of scientists in the decision making of the agency. He also played an active role in creating a link between NASA and university education in America. Webb created the NASA University Program which helped establish space grants, provide fellowships to graduate students, and build scientific research laboratories at universities. This linkage between NASA and education continues today and is evidenced in the RealWorld-InWorld Engineering Design Challenge. This challenge is focused on the telescope which bears the name of James Webb, the man that launched America into the successful era of space exploration that provided much understanding and scientific breakthrough.

Telescope
The James Webb Space Telescope was launched on December 25, 2021. From its orbit of about 1 million miles from the Earth's surface the JWST will use infrared technology to peer into space, helping scientists make observations about the origins of the universe. The JWST will observe the history of the universe from the moments following the Big Bang through the formation of solar systems, including our own. It will study the origin of life supporting environments and the process of planetary formation.

The JWST is a collaborative effort between NASA, the European Space Agency, and the Canadian Space Agency. The project is currently being managed by the NASA Goddard Space Center. The contracting company involved in the development is Northrop Grumman. After launch the telescope will be operated by the Space Telescope Science Institute. The project was formerly known as the "Next Generation Space Telescope" but was renamed after James Webb in 2002.

The goals of the JWST are grouped into four scientific themes:
 The End of the Dark Ages: First Light and Reionization
 Assembly of Galaxies
 The Birth of Stars and Protoplanetary Systems
 Planetary Systems and the Origins of Life

The JWST is similar to its predecessor, the Hubble Space Telescope, in some ways, but in many ways it is different, allowing scientists to gain new prospective and understanding of the universe. The JWST "views" the universe in the infrared, whereas the Hubble views the universe in optical and ultra-violet. This combination of viewpoints allows scientists to put together a more complete picture of the universe. The mirror on the JWST is also much larger than the mirror on the Hubble Space Telescope allowing it to collect even more light and peer even farther back in time. Since light travels at a great speed, the farther away it has traveled from the greater amount of time has passed since its origination. The JWST will also orbit much farther away from earth than the Hubble. The Hubble resides very close to earth, whereas the JWST will reside much farther away than even the moon.

Getting started 2011

Phase 1: RealWorld

Participants
Teachers/coaches and high-school-aged students

Objective
Work cooperatively as engineers and scientists to explore and design solutions for one of two real-world problems related to either the James Webb Space Telescope or Robonaut 2. RealWorld Solutions are created in a face-to-face environment of small teams of high school students and coaches/teachers. Submitted final project solutions will be featured on the RealWorld-InWorld website and teams will receive recognition for their work. Only teams that submit their final RealWorld project solutions by January 27, 2012, are eligible to move into the InWorld phase.

Phase 2: InWorld

Participants 
Participating college students select teams of 3-5 high-school-aged students and their teacher/coach. Each team selects a participating engineering mentor.  Many of the participants are also participants in NASA's INSPIRE program.

Objective 
Work in a 3D virtual environment using 21st Century tools to refine designs and to create 3D models of the James Webb Space Telescope and Robonaut 2. Engineers from both distinct projects will visit and "chat" InWorld throughout the challenge. Unlike RealWorld, the InWorld Challenge is located in a virtual environment hosted within the NIA Universe virtual reality world. Teams create and build their solutions to the proposed problems within this virtual environment.

References

External links
 Student Engineering Design Challenge
The Center for Mathematics, Science, and Technology

Science competitions